This article lists the chiefs of the General Staff of the Argentine Air Force and their preceding offices, between 1945 and the present day. The Argentine Air Force is the air force of Argentina. By law, the chief of the Argentine Air Force must be an active pilot.

The current Chief of the Air Force General Staff is Brigadier Xavier Isaac. He was appointed by President Alberto Fernández on 28 February 2020 by Decree 180/2020.

List

See also

Argentine Air Force
Chief of the General Staff of the Argentine Army
Chief of the General Staff of the Argentine Navy

References

Argentine Air Force personnel
Argentine generals
Argentine military-related lists
Argentina